1356  is the fourth novel in The Grail Quest series by Bernard Cornwell, first published in 2012. It is set in 1356, nearly a decade after the original trilogy, and culminates with the Battle of Poitiers. Intertwined in the plot is the quest to find La Malice, a fabled sword of Saint Peter and Christian relic which may turn the tide of the long war for France. It is Cornwell's fiftieth novel.

Plot summary

The novel picks up the story of Thomas of Hookton, the English archer at the center of Bernard Cornwell's trilogy of novels concerning The Grail Quest, which ended with Thomas's return to England from France in 1347.  Back in France now, Thomas has achieved his ambition of leading his own company of archers and men at arms who hire out to anyone willing to pay them - provided they are not asked to fight against the English.  Although knighted years earlier by his liege lord and patron, the Earl of Northampton, Thomas prefers to be known as Le Bâtard, leader of the Hellequin, as his band of mercenaries call themselves.  He has married Genevieve, the young Frenchwoman he rescued from the Inquisition during the Grail Quest.  They have a son Hugh, already in training to use the longbow that makes English archers feared throughout Europe.  As the novel opens, Thomas and his men are fighting on behalf of a French count who has hired them to assault a nearby castle.  Brother Michael, a young monk from England who is travelling to Montpellier to train as a healer, brings Thomas a message from the Earl.  The message will involve Thomas and his men in a dangerous quest for yet another holy relic, a sword said to have belonged to Saint Peter.   Meanwhile, Fra Ferdinand, a Black Friar, retrieves the sword from a tomb at the request of an old friend - only to learn that his friend has been murdered by men who claim they were sent by the Pope at Avignon to search for it.  Thomas, Michael, Fra Ferdinand, and other characters, some new and some from the previous books, are swept up in the chaotic conditions of France during the Hundred Years War, culminating in the Battle of Poitiers, where a king is overthrown and the history of Europe is changed.

Characters
 Thomas of Hookton - leader of a band of English archers and Gascon men at arms in southern France, knighted earlier
 Genevieve - Thomas' wife
 Hugh - Thomas' son
 Karyl - one of the Hellequin, from Bohemia
 "Robbie" Douglas - Scottish noble and knighted, Thomas's friend, under oath not to fight the English, a few years younger than his uncle
 William, Lord of Douglas - Uncle of Robbie Douglas, fighting for the French so he can fight the English, 28 years old
 Sculley - a fearsome Scottish warrior in the service of William Douglas, whom most call an "animal"
 Brother Michael - a young English monk travelling to Montpellier for education, 22 years old, who joins the Hellequin
 Éamonn Óg Ó Keane - an Irish student at Montpellier studying to be a priest who joins Thomas' band, about 18 years old
 The Count of Labrouillade - a fat and rich French nobleman, brutal and adulterous, who hires Roland de Verrec to bring back his wife, about 39 years old
 Bertille, Countess of Labrouillade - the beautiful young wife of the Count of Labrouillade, 19 years old, married since she was 12
 Sir Roland de Verrec - The Virgin Knight, the finest tournament fighter of France
 Edward, the Black Prince - Prince of Wales and leader of the English army
 William de Bohun, 1st Earl of Northampton - English commander and Thomas' liege lord, who he calls Billy
 Jean III de Grailly, captal de Buch - One of the leaders of the English army
 William de Montacute, 2nd Earl of Salisbury - One of the leaders of the English army
 Jean II - the King of France
 Prince Charles - Dauphin of France, eldest son of king Jean
 Prince Philippe - youngest son of king Jean
 Arnoul d'Audrehem - Marshal of France
 Cardinal Bessières - Corrupt French cardinal who aspires to become Pope
 Father Marchant/Father Calade - an evil priest working for the cardinal
 Roger de Beaufort - a clever but conservative student at Montpellier
 Fra Ferdinand - a brave monk, a Black Friar, who recovers the holy sword La Malice. 
 Duke of Orleans - A French noble who abandons King Jean at the battle of Poitiers

Reviews
Bill Sheehan writing in The Washington Post finds this latest addition to Cornwell's historical novels to be accurate, coherent, lively and accessible.

Much of Cornwell’s considerable reputation rests on the quality of his battle sequences, which are vivid, colorful and invariably convincing. His account of what happened in the field outside Poitiers is no exception. As always, Cornwell captures the essence of hand-to-hand combat — the stench, the confusion, the horrific brutality — with precision and immediacy. More than that, he imposes a degree of coherence on what must have been an utterly chaotic experience....The result is a lively, accessible account of a remote moment in European history, a book in which Cornwell’s gifts as scholar and storyteller come together spectacularly.

Publishers Weekly says no one describes a close hand-to-hand battle like Bernard Cornwell:

Cornwell, a master of action-packed historical fiction, returns with the fourth book in his Grail Quest series (after Heretic), a vivid, exciting portrayal of medieval warfare as the English and French butcher each other at the Battle of Poitiers in 1356 during the Hundred Years War. Nobody writes battle scenes like Cornwell, accurately conveying the utter savagery of close combat with sword, ax, and mace, and the gruesome aftermath. English archer Sir Thomas of Hookton, called the Bastard by his enemies, leads a band of ruthless mercenaries in France. When the French hear of the existence of the sword of Saint Peter, “another Excalibur,” they must possess it for its legendary mystical powers, but the English have other ideas. Thomas is ordered by his lord, earl of Northampton, to find the sword first and begins, with his men, a perilous journey of raiding and plundering across southern France, fighting brutal warlords, cunning churchmen, with betrayal everywhere, and French and Scottish knights who vow to kill Thomas for reasons that have nothing to do with the sword. With surprising results, Thomas and his men reach the decisive Battle of Poitiers, a vicious melee that killed thousands, unseated a king, and forced a devastating and short peace on a land ravaged by warfare. Agent: Toby Eady Associates, U.K.. (Jan.) 

Kirkus Reviews finds this novel's plot less tightly woven than the best of Bernard Cornwell's novels, limiting its audience to those who already have interest in the historical period of the fight for France in the Hundred Years' War.

Few of these characters have any inkling that a pivotal battle in the endless war for France looms ahead. Neither, for that matter, will unwary readers. For, although every intrigue springs to life under the close-up focus veteran Cornwell (Death of Kings, 2012, etc.) has long since mastered, the strands aren’t always closely knitted together: Heroes and subplots blossom and fade with no consistent sense of their connections, and readers approaching the tale without the appropriate historical background will have to survive a long probationary period before they realize where this is all heading.

Best for fans of historical fiction who have both a taste for the Hundred Years’ War and some base-line knowledge that will allow them to enjoy this swashbuckling recreation.

References

Thomas of Hookton novels
2012 British novels
Fiction set in the 1350s
Novels set in the 14th century
1356
HarperCollins books